Earl Lee Blair Greene (July 4, 1899 – February 3, 1995) was an American football, basketball, baseball, and track and field coach. He serve as the head football coach at Albany College—now known as Lewis & Clark College—from 1923 to 1925 and Winona State Teachers College—now known as Winona State University in 1934.

Education and playing career
Greene was a member of the University of Illinois football team in 1921, after transferring from Albion College in Michigan.

Greene graduated from Lewis & Clark College, then known as Albany College, in Portland, Oregon in 1924. His, father, Clarence W. Greene, was the president of Albany College.

Coaching career
Greene served as the head football coach at Albany College for three seasons, from 1923 to 1925. He was also the school's athletic director for one year before resigning in 1926 to become a physical education coach and teacher at McLoughlin High School in Milton, Oregon. Greene led his football team at McLoughlin  to the eastern Oregon championship in the fall of 1926. He also coached baseball, basketball, and track at Milton.

Winona State
Greene was named the head football coach at Winona State University, then known as Winona State Teachers College, in Winona, Minnesota in 1934. He also served as the school's head basketball coach for the 1934–35 season, leading the team to a record of 7–9.

Death
Green died on February 3, 1995.

Head coaching record

College football

References

External links
 

1899 births
1995 deaths
American football guards
Albion Britons football players
Illinois Fighting Illini football players
Iowa Hawkeyes football coaches
Lewis & Clark Pioneers athletic directors
Lewis & Clark Pioneers football coaches
Winona State Warriors football coaches
Winona State Warriors men's basketball coaches
College track and field coaches in the United States
High school baseball coaches in the United States
High school basketball coaches in Oregon
High school football coaches in Oregon
High school track and field coaches in the United States
Lewis & Clark College alumni
Oregon State University alumni
University of Iowa alumni
People from Albion, Michigan
Coaches of American football from Michigan
Players of American football from Michigan
Baseball coaches from Michigan
Basketball coaches from Michigan